Marija Ana Milinković (born 16 November 2004) is a Bosnian footballer who plays as a midfielder for SFK 2000 from Sarajevo and the Bosnia and Herzegovina women's national team. She was twice in a row voted Best Bosnia and Herzegovina Women's Premier League Player of the Year.

References

2004 births
Living people
Bosnia and Herzegovina women's footballers
Women's association football midfielders
Bosnia and Herzegovina women's international footballers